George Albert Hawkins (15 October 1883 – 22 September 1917) was a British athlete. He competed in the 1908 Summer Olympics in London. He was born in Tottenham and died in Ypres.

In the 200 metres, Hawkins ran the race in 22.8 seconds to beat two other runners and advance to the semifinals. There, won again, this time finishing in 22.6 seconds. This allowed him to advance to the final, in which he placed last out of the four finalists. His time in the final was 22.9 seconds. The winner's time was 22.6, a time he had achieved in the semifinal.

Hawkins was killed in action, aged 34, during World War I, serving as a gunner with the Royal Garrison Artillery during the Third Battle of Ypres. He was buried in the Bard Cottage Cemetery nearby.

He was married to Violet Freeman and had five children with her.

See also
 List of Olympians killed in World War I

References

Sources

External links
Hawkins Family Tree

1883 births
1917 deaths
Athletes (track and field) at the 1908 Summer Olympics
Olympic athletes of Great Britain
Royal Garrison Artillery soldiers
British military personnel killed in World War I
People from Tottenham
Athletes from London
English male sprinters
British male sprinters
British Army personnel of World War I
Burials at Bard Cottage Cemetery
Military personnel from Middlesex